Mohammed Magdi Qorqor, is the Secretary General of Egyptian Labor Party, whose activity was suspended by the Egyptian Party Affairs Committee in the year 2000. He is an Egyptian politician and journalist, and a professor and head of the Environmental Planning and Infrastructure Department College of Urban Planning Cairo University. He had prominent activity in the Engineers Against the Guard movement, and he is a leader in the National Alliance to Support Legitimacy and rejected the coup, which been created on 2013 against the military coup in Egypt.

Scientific Degrees 
 Bachelor of Civil Engineering (BSc) – Cairo University – July 1975
 Master of Science (MSc) in Civil Engineering 1981
 Doctor of Philosophy (PhD) in Civil Engineering 1986

Political Activities 
 Secretary General of the Labor Party (Egypt), June 2011.
 Assistant Secretary General of the Labor Party 1993 to June 2011
 Assistant General Coordinator Egyptian Movement for Change "Kifaya" (February 2007 – January 2011).
 One of the founders and a member of the Executive Office Egyptian Movement for Change "Kifaya" (February 2005 – February 2007).
 Member of the Board of Trustees of the Global Campaign to Counter the Aggression (February 2005 – date)
 Member of the Islamic National Conference – 2000 to date (Beirut)
 Coordinator of the Front of the Ummah Scholars and Thinkers – Cairo (2003–2007)
 Member of the National Committee for the Defense of Prisoners of Conscience (1993–present).
 Secretary of Education – Labor Party 1989 to June 2011
 Participated in student activity at Cairo University (1970–1975)

Imprisonment and detention 
He was arrested on 2 July 2014 one day before the first anniversary of the military coup in Egypt and after the National Alliance to Support Legitimacy call for demonstrations in That memory, and he was charged with joining a terrorist group and inciting violence, according to investigations However, the court released him in that case as he is not guilty.

He was previously arrested in the events of 6 April 2008 with the April 6 Youth Movement, and he was released after 18 days after his college students at Cairo University demonstrated, denouncing his arrest.

References

External links
Kefaya Website
Middle East Report Online
openDemocracy
Human Rights Watch
Carnegie Endowment for International Peace

Egyptian journalists
Egyptian revolution of 2011
Nonviolent resistance movements
Politics of Egypt
2011 in Egypt